Great Haddon is a major settlement proposed in Peterborough, Cambridgeshire, England, near Yaxley. It was granted planning permission in 2015 after a lengthy application process, which included concerns over infrastructure provision.

The development will comprise 5,350 homes, a district shopping centre, three primary schools and one secondary school.

References

New towns in England